Romeo Bleeding: Live from Austin is a live album by Tom Waits, first released in 2009 on Immortal/IMC Music Ltd. The album was recorded on December 5, 1978 in Austin, Texas. This album is not approved by the artist.

Track listing
All compositions by Tom Waits, except where noted.

Personnel
 Tom Waits - vocals, piano
 Herbert Hardesty - saxophone, trumpet, flugelhorn 
 Arthur Richardson - guitar
 John Thomassie - drums
 Greg Cohen - bass guitar

References

Tom Waits albums
2009 albums